This is a list of Spanish television related events in 1986.

Events 
 13 January: First time Television in Spain broadcasts during the Morning Time. Debut of the show ‘’Buenos días’’ (‘’Good Morning’’), with José Antonio Martínez Soler.
 27 June: Classical movie Gone with the wind is aired on Spanish TV for the first time.
 18 October: Pilar Miró is appointed Director General of RTVE.

Debuts

Television shows

La 1

Ending this year

La 1

Foreign series debuts in Spain

Births 
 28 March - Amaia Salamanca, actress.
20 May - Yon González, actor.
 29 May - Lara Álvarez, hostess.
 10 June - Francisco Ortiz, actor.
 12 June - Mario Casas, actor.
 19 June - Alicia Rozas, actress.
 20 June - Andrés de la Cruz, actor.
 15 July - Anabel Pantoja, pundit.
 21 July - Fernando Tielve, actor.
 31 July - Alba Carrillo, pundit.
 14 September - Michelle Jenner, actress.
 5 October - Valeria Ros, hostess.
 27 October - Alba Flores, actress.
 10 November - Aarón Guerrero, actor.

Deaths 
 5 January - Nieves Romero, hostess.
 26 March - Ángel Marrero, journalist.
 16 June - Luisa Sala, actress, 62.
 18 August - Juan José Rosón Pérez, director General of RTVE, 53.

See also
1986 in Spain
List of Spanish films of 1986

References 

1986 in Spanish television